Crime Writers of Canada (CWC) is a national, non-profit organization, founded in 1982 by Derrick Murdock and other professional crime writers.  Its mandate is to promote crime writing in Canada and to raise the profile of the genre's established and aspiring authors.

Crime writing, as defined by the CWC, is any fictional or factual book-length work, novella or short-story that features crime as a major or principal element, and is written for any print or electronic medium.  The genre includes any written account of criminal activity, crime detection and/or crime solving, set in any historical or geographical context, and usually involves a strong element of suspense.  Crime Fiction may include detective stories, mysteries, thrillers, tales of espionage and suspense, as well courtroom, police or forensic procedural dramas.  Other genres such as romance or speculative fiction may also involve a strong criminal or crime-detection theme.

Among the CWC members are professional and emerging authors, publicists and literary critics, author representatives, librarians, book sellers, and fans of crime fiction.

The CWC offers several author promotion services for its members, including exposure on the national website for recent book releases, in quarterly catalogues, in newsletters, in municipal, regional and national events, and with annual award presentations.

Annual Awards

The Arthur Ellis Awards for Excellence in Canadian Crime Writing, first established in 1984, are presented at an annual banquet.  The awards are named for Arthur B. English, a British expatriate who, under the pseudonym Arthur Ellis, became Canada's official hangman in 1913.  His professional successors adopted the same pseudonym.

The Arthur Ellis Award itself is an articulated wooden model of a man hanging from gallows.  It is presented to the winner of each of six categories, including Best Crime Novel, Best First Crime Novel, Best Crime Book in French, Best Crime Nonfiction, Best Juvenile/Young Adult Crime Book, and Best Crime Short Story.  A similar award is given to the winner in the Best Unpublished First Crime Novel ("The Unhanged Arthur").  The Derrick Murdoch Award is a special achievement award and is given, at the discretion of the CWC President, to a CWC Member who has contributed greatly to the advancement of the CWC and/or to crime writing in Canada.

External links
Official Website
Arthur Ellis Awards
 
CrimeFictionCanada

Canadian writers' organizations
1982 establishments in Canada
Arts organizations established in 1982